The Prince and the Pauper: The Movie, or simply The Prince and the Pauper, is a 2007 film directed by James Quattrochi and starring Dylan and Cole Sprouse, based on the 1881 novel by Mark Twain.

The film had a 'sneak peek' showing in Temecula, California, before being released globally on DVD. It has also screened on television worldwide, mostly on the Disney Channel, because of the Sprouse Twins' association with the network (the two played the lead roles on The Suite Life of Zack & Cody and The Suite Life on Deck).

The countries in which it has been shown on the Disney Channel include Australia/New Zealand, Spain/Portugal (January 17, 2009), and Disney Channel Latin America, where it aired on January 31, 2009 before a mini-marathon of The Suite Life on Deck. The film had previously had a sneak peek on Disney Channel UK, but it premiered on the channel on February 6, 2009, on the same day as The Suite Life on Deck premiere.

The production company was Oak Films.

Plot

The movie opens showing super star Eddie Tudor (Cole Sprouse) on the red carpet at the premiere of one of his films. Tom Canty (Dylan Sprouse) watches it on TV and imitates Eddie (he mimics him by saying his catchphrase "Oh yeah!"), when his grandpa, 'Pop' (Ed Lauter), calls him to get ready for school. At school, the principal asks what his ambition is in life, and Tom replies that he wants to be Eddie Tudor. The principal then advises him to join the acting classes (which Pop doesn't allow him to do). He has lived with Pop since his parents died a couple of years earlier. From a young age, Tom has wanted to become an actor, partly inspired by the stories of fame and appeal of acting conveyed to him by his neighbour and best friend, Miles (Vincent Spano). Miles is a former actor who has known Tom since quitting showbiz and moving to the area when Tom was a little. He often tells Tom about his life as a star, although not revealing much as to how he lost his fame. Now 14, the same age as Eddie Tudor whom he looks exactly like, he wishes that he really is Eddie and gets frustrated with his Pop's persistent pushing for Tom to forget about the acting, and telling him to do 'real work', like helping him with his business, when Tom is not at school. He says he only pushes Tom because he cares about him. Miles, however, supports Tom's acting ambition, but warns him that it is a tough business to get into and survive in.

Meanwhile, Eddie Tudor is frustrated with his life and being told what to do all the time. He doesn’t seem so interested in acting and can’t understand why his single mom (Dedee Pfeiffer) pushes him so hard to stick at it. He longs for some freedom and to be able to be a normal kid. Not appreciating what he has, he constantly goofs off on set and unknown to him, he is about to be dropped from the production that they have recently started filming in Palm Beach, where Tom lives. When Tom hears about the production, he visits the lot where it is taking place, in the hope of meeting his idol, Eddie Tudor, and getting into the acting business. During a break from shooting, Tom (who sneaked onto the set and hid under a trailer) meets Eddie for the first time. Eddie, pleased to see another kid on set to hang out with, invites him into his trailer and the two talk and play Eddie's Xbox. Tom is thrilled to meet Eddie and see inside his trailer and be on a film set, also to play the Xbox, since Tom doesn’t have one at his Pop's house. Eddie says that his mom doesn’t care how much he plays the Xbox in his spare time, because she is so busy. Tom tells Eddie how lucky he is, in comparison to him, but he's a friend of the former actor, Milles. Eddie doesn’t seem impressed by this, though, having never heard of Milles or other actors that Tom speaks about. Tom notices that Eddie doesn’t seem to appear that interested in acting, choosing to concentrate mainly on his Xbox that he's playing. Tom then spots Eddie's suit which he wears on screen in the 'Spy Teen' films and asks Eddie if he can try it on. Eddie, still engrossed in the game, replies "Sure, whatever". Eddie takes notice however, when he sees Tom in his suit and hairstyle, and realises that he and Tom are identical in appearance. He then puts on Tom's clothes and changes his appearance, and they are stunned to see how much they look alike. The Assistant Director of the film Eddie's shooting then comes into the trailer and, realising that he now has a chance for a bit of freedom away from filming, Eddie (who now looks exactly like Tom) says "Well, Eddie, it was great to meet you, but I best get going", leaving a startled Tom in his place, who will now have to act just like Eddie.

The real Eddie meets Pop, who picked him up from the sidewalk that he was walking along. Thinking that he is Tom, Pop drives him home in his pick-up, lecturing him about why he should have come straight home from school. Eddie sees Tom's home and his bedroom, which has posters of Spy Teen and 'Miami Squad', which Milles starred in, on the wall. The next day he and Pop go to work (Pop runs a landscaping business and Tom sometimes helps him) where Eddie tells him that he's not Tom and explains what happened, realising that he's not having much fun or freedom planting trees with Pop, and a frustrated Pop starts thinking that 'Tom' has gone mad. Meanwhile, the real Tom realises that fame isn’t everything it's portrayed to be as he has to cope with being ordered about by Eddie Tudor's mother and his agent and packing loads of filming and appearances into his day. At first, he faints with the shock of so quickly becoming Eddie and acting in a big movie, as he had for so long dreamed about. He is then accused of faking the faint by Eddie's agent and given a row by her and Eddie's mom for creating a fuss when they relocate to Miami, who dismiss his behavior as Eddie's usual playing-up and don’t listen to him when he tries to explain that he is just a normal kid who switched places with Eddie for a laugh, and that they are leaving Eddie behind in Palm Beach, as well as Tom's own life. He asks if they can go back, but is refused, so Tom adjusts to his sudden new life as Eddie and enjoys it and acts well as Eddie and the character that Eddie must play, but he misses Pop and Miles. Tom Canty proves to be a 'better Eddie than Eddie', according to Elizabeth (Kay Panabaker), the cute co-star of Eddie Tudor in the production they are shooting together. She gets along with Tom much better than Eddie, which is why she realises that the boy she is now working with can't be Eddie and demands to know who he is. Tom explains all to Elizabeth and the two become close as they keep up the pretense in front of everyone around them, including Eddie's mom and Jerry (his agent), whilst they figure out what to do. Elizabeth suggests that Tom phone home, so he does, explaining all and knowing that he will be in trouble if his pop believes him.

As the days pass by, both Tom and Eddie try to tell people that they are not who everyone thinks they are. All Tom can now do is hope that his Pop comes to pick him up, whilst Eddie, upon realising that the production has moved to Miami, decides to get to the film set himself. He hotwires his boat (which was left in Palm Beach) after Miles takes the key from him and throws it into the water to stop who he thinks is Tom from running away from home. After he doesn’t get very far in the boat, Eddie has to be bailed out by Milles from the police station, and driven home to Pop who starts on Miles for interfering. Miles says he just cares about Tom and doesn’t want to see him going off the rails, but warns Pop that's what will happen if he keeps pushing him. Whilst they are arguing, Eddie jumps into Milles' car and drives off in it. Pop and Milles follow him in Pop's truck, losing track of him when he stops at a roadside service station to buy a veggie burger meal. At the film set in Miami, Milles and Pop bluff their way in by saying that they are extras. They also ask if there has been a kid pretending to be Eddie Tudor trying to sneak in yet, to which the security guard replies, "No sir, not yet". Later, Eddie arrives and the guard says to him, "You must be pretending to be Eddie Tudor" and lets him in. Once on the set, he spots Tom and confronts him, yelling "You're dead, punk!" and they have a brawl with Eddie ranting "You took my identity!", Tom responds with "It wasn’t my fault-They switched location!". Eventually, all calms down and everyone finds out who is who and what has happened. Eddie tells his mom that he now realises that she only pushes him because she cares, to which she says "That's right", and she also reunites with Miles, whom she used to date before Eddie was born, while he was still in the business-before he went off on his own, which he tells her was because he didn’t like the person he had become, not because he disliked her or acting. She understands and reveals to him that Eddie is his son.(Earlier in the movie when Miles thinks he is speaking with Tom he says "I'm not your Dad, but I care about you a lot......I’ve known you since you were a little kid and I've always thought you were cute, Tom".)(it is never mentioned to Eddie that Miles is his father).

The movie ends with Eddie and Miles getting to know each other for real, as father and son, and, Miles and Eddie's mom hinting to each other about getting back together. All remain friends with Tom and he is taken on by Jerry to have his own acting career, starting with a production of Mark Twain's Prince and the Pauper with Eddie. "We were going to use twins, but I think Tom and Eddie would be great" said Jerry. "They sure fooled all of us". Pop asks Tom if that is definitely what he would like to do and after hearing the excited reply finally gives his approval and blessing to Tom. Milles tells Eddie that he is a lot younger than he was when he first started acting and says that the most important thing he learned was to be gracious and treat people with respect. He asks if Eddie can do that, to which he replies, "I will now!" and he does, just insulting Elizabeth jokingly at the filming of Prince and the Pauper, which she does back. They film with Tom, whilst Milles is now trying his hand at directing, with Eddie's mom producing and Jerry (Sally Kellerman) and Pop looking on. The end credits then begin, whilst the final shot shows of Eddie and Tom chilling together and with Miles barbecuing in a garden and everyone looks happy as Milles plays football with Tom, and his lookalike that he's known for much less time but who is really his son, Eddie, proud that the boys are following in his footsteps as actors and knows that they will not make the mistakes that he did after everything that they learned in their fun adventure: A Modern Twain Story: The Prince and the Pauper.

Cast 
 Cole Sprouse as Eddie Tudor
 Dylan Sprouse as Tom Canty
 Kay Panabaker as Elizabeth
 Vincent Spano as Miles
 Dedee Pfeiffer as Harlen
 Sally Kellerman as Jerry
 Ed Lauter as Pop

Soundtrack
The soundtrack features music by Frequency 5 including "So Good So Strange" produced by Taboo from The Black Eyed Peas. Also includes "Life Is Good" performed by Junk, as well as "Beautiful Way", by Live Society, and "Here I Go Again" performed by Jessa. A cover of Skye Sweetnam's "This Is Me" (the opening track to The Barbie Diaries), sung by Kay Panabaker is featured.

Reception
Carrie Wheadon from Common Sense Media gave the film two out of five stars, calling it a "slow story for Zack and Cody fans only." A critic from The Dove Foundation wrote that "This is a fun film with a modern twist to the Mark Twain story, “The Prince and the Pauper”".

References

External links
 

2007 films
2007 comedy films
2007 direct-to-video films
2000s children's comedy films
2000s teen comedy films
American children's comedy films
American direct-to-video films
American teen comedy films
Direct-to-video comedy films
Films about actors
Films based on The Prince and the Pauper
Films scored by Dennis McCarthy
Films set in Florida
Sony Pictures direct-to-video films
2000s English-language films